Oak Knoll may refer to one of a number of places:

United States
 Oak Knoll, California
 Oak Knoll, Pasadena, California
 Oak Knoll School, an elementary school in Menlo Park, California
 Oak Knoll District of Napa Valley AVA, California wine region in Napa County, California
Oak Knoll (Atlanta), a subdivision in southeast Atlanta, Georgia that received national attention in the 1930s for its financing model
 Oak Knoll, Florida, an unincorporated area in Manatee County, Florida
 Oak Knoll Naval Hospital, a former hospital in Oakland, California
 Oak Knoll (Winchester, Massachusetts), listed on the NRHP in Massachusetts
 Oak Knoll School of the Holy Child, a private school in New Jersey
 Oak Knoll Wildlife Sanctuary, in Attleboro, Massachusetts
 Oak Knoll Books and Press, a bookseller and publisher in New Castle, Delaware